The Swedish Medical Society is an independent and scientific professional organization formed by Swedish physicians, including doctors from all medical specialties. Its aims are the promoting of research, education, quality in health care

Organization

The society was founded in 1808 by Jacob Berzelius, Jonas Henrik Gistrén, Erik Gadelius, Anders Johan Hagströmer, Carl Fredrik von Schulzenheim, Eric Carl Trafvenfelt, and Henrik Gahn.  The organization is one of the oldest of its kind in Europe. Full membership is open to those who have  graduated in medicine in a Nordic country, have graduated in medicine elsewhere and are licensed to practise in Sweden, or hold a doctorate at a medical faculty in Sweden.

In 2022, there were over 20,000 members.

References

External links
Official website

Medical associations based in Sweden
Organizations established in 1808